Demodex brevis is one of the two species of face mite that inhabit humans (the other being Demodex folliculorum). They are very similar to Demodex folliculorum, with just a few differences. They are usually found in the sebaceous glands of the human body. The same way that D. folliculorum reproduces in the follicles, D. brevis reproduces in the sebaceous glands. Under normal conditions they are not harmful, and are considered to be commensals (the mite benefits but there is no harm or benefit to the host) rather than parasites (where the host is harmed) or mutualistic organisms (where the host is benefitted).  During a severe infestation, though, there may be adverse effects on the host, such as demodicosis.

References

Trombidiformes
Animals described in 1963
Parasitic_arthropods_of_humans